Patricio Rodolfo Rubio Pulgar (born 18 April 1989), nicknamed Pato Rubio, is a Chilean footballer who plays as a forward for club Ñublense.

International career

International goals

Personal life
At the same time he is a footballer, he is the owner of Golden Bull Eleven, a property company.

Honours

Club
Colo-Colo
 Primera División de Chile (1): 2006 Clausura

 Barnechea
Tercera A (1): 2011

Unión Española
Primera División de Chile (1): 2013 Transición
Supercopa de Chile (1): 2013

Universidad de Chile
Primera División de Chile (1): 2014 Apertura
Copa Chile (1): 2015
Supercopa de Chile (1): 2015

Querétaro
Copa MX: Apertura 2016

References

External links
 
 Rubio at Football Lineups
 

1989 births
Living people
footballers from Santiago
Chilean footballers
Chilean expatriate footballers
Chile international footballers
Colo-Colo footballers
Ñublense footballers
Rivadavia de Lincoln footballers
Deportes Iberia footballers
A.C. Barnechea footballers
Unión Española footballers
Universidad de Chile footballers
Querétaro F.C. footballers
Dorados de Sinaloa footballers
Everton de Viña del Mar footballers
Universidad de Concepción footballers
Club Alianza Lima footballers
Chilean Primera División players
Torneo Argentino A players
Tercera División de Chile players
Primera B de Chile players
Segunda División Profesional de Chile players
Liga MX players
Ascenso MX players
Peruvian Primera División players
Expatriate footballers in Argentina
Chilean expatriate sportspeople in Argentina
Expatriate footballers in Mexico
Chilean expatriate sportspeople in Mexico
Expatriate footballers in Peru
Chilean expatriate sportspeople in Peru
Association football forwards